Oosternum is a genus of water scavenger beetles in the family Hydrophilidae. There are more than 20 described species in Oosternum.

Species
These 23 species belong to the genus Oosternum:

 Oosternum acutheca
 Oosternum aequinoctiale Motschulsky, 1855
 Oosternum andersoni Deler-Hernández, Cala-Riquelme & Fikáček, 2014
 Oosternum attacomis Spangler, 1962
 Oosternum attenuatum
 Oosternum bacharenge Deler-Hernández, Cala-Riquelme & Fikáček, 2014
 Oosternum cercyonoides Deler-Hernández, Cala-Riquelme & Fikáček, 2014
 Oosternum cicatricosum
 Oosternum convexum
 Oosternum costatum (LeConte, 1855)
 Oosternum gibbicolle
 Oosternum holosericeum
 Oosternum horni d'Orchymont, 1914
 Oosternum insulare Deler-Hernández, Cala-Riquelme & Fikáček, 2014
 Oosternum intermedium
 Oosternum latum Fikacek, Hebauer & Hansen, 2009
 Oosternum luciae Deler-Hernández, Cala-Riquelme & Fikáček, 2014
 Oosternum megnai Deler-Hernández, Cala-Riquelme & Fikáček, 2014
 Oosternum okinawaense Hoshina, 2011
 Oosternum pecki Deler-Hernández, Cala-Riquelme & Fikáček, 2014
 Oosternum pubescens (LeConte, 1855)
 Oosternum sharpi Hansen, 1999
 Oosternum simplex

References

Further reading

 

Hydrophilidae
Articles created by Qbugbot